Rovato is a railway station serving the town of Rovato, in the region of Lombardy, northern Italy. The station opened on 5 March 1878 and is located on the Milan–Venice railway and Bergamo–Brescia railway. The train services are operated by  Trenord.

The Cremona–Iseo railway passes just north of the station, calling at a separate station Rovato Borgo railway station, before joining the main Milan–Venice railway east of the station. It is on this railway that there is a station close to the centre of Rovato, Rovato Citta railway station.

History
Between 1897 and 1915 the station was served by horse-drawn tram services on the Iseo-Rovato-Chiari tramway.

Train services
The station is served by the following service(s):

Express services (Treno regionale) Milan - Treviglio - Brescia - Verona
Regional services (Treno regionale) Sesto San Giovanni - Milan - Treviglio - Brescia
Regional services (Treno regionale) Bergamo - Rovato - Brescia

See also

History of rail transport in Italy
List of railway stations in Lombardy
Rail transport in Italy
Railway stations in Italy

References

 This article is based upon a translation of the Italian language version as of January 2016.

External links

Railway stations in Lombardy
Railway stations opened in 1878
1878 establishments in Italy
Buildings and structures in the Province of Brescia
Railway stations in Italy opened in the 19th century